coComment was an online service that let users keep track of their comments on any website. After a user installed the coComment bookmarklet or web browser plug-in, they could use it to track their comments and any replies to their comments on any webpage that they visit. The service had over 1.3 million users as of July 1, 2008.

References

External links
 Official website (archive)

Internet forums
Internet properties established in 2006
Companies based in Geneva
Internet properties disestablished in 2012
Swiss companies disestablished in 2012
Swiss companies established in 2006